Per Davidsson (born 5 April 1958) is an entrepreneurship professor that holds Swedish and Australian citizenship. He is currently a professor of entrepreneurship at Jönköping International Business School and Queensland University of Technology Business School and served as the Talbot Family Foundation Chair in Entrepreneurship at the Australian Centre for Entrepreneurship Research (ACE) during 2010–2018. He serves on the editorial boards for several journals and has participated in many research programs including the Comprehensive Australian Study of Entrepreneurial Emergence.

Early life and career 

Davidsson grew up in Sandviken, a small, one-employer steel town in Sweden. He received his BA in Business Administration in 1984, his MSc. in 1987 and his PhD in Economic Psychology in 1989 at Stockholm School of Economics. In 1990 he moved to Umeå University, where he got involved in an international-collaborative project with the entrepreneurship academics David Storey and Paul Reynolds, which ignited his international career. In 1994, he moved to take part in the start-up of Jönköping International Business School (JIBS) to start a high-class business school with an entrepreneurship focus. During this time, Davidsson helped in the creation of a research environment within JIBS; it was recently identified as second in the world in entrepreneurship and first in Scandinavia in business research.

Throughout his career, Davidsson has served as professor in many universities in Sweden and Australia and held membership as editor and reviewer in high-profile scientific journals. In 1992 he became Director of the Transportation Research Unit at Umeå University and at JIBS he served as Head of the Entrepreneurship, Marketing and Management Department and led the PEG (Program on Entrepreneurship and SMEs) research program. 
Through his publications and research, Davidsson is known for his interest on start-up and growth of small firms. He has published over 70 peer reviewed articles in prestigious journals, such as Strategic Management Journal, Regional Studies, Journal of Management Studies, Entrepreneurship Theory & Practice, Entrepreneurship and Regional Development, and Journal of Business Venturing.

Honors and awards 

1. Dr. rer. pol h.c, Leuphana University, Germany (honorary doctorate), 2013

2. Recipient of the "Mentor Award" from the 3,000 member strong Entrepreneurship Division of the Academy of Management, 2013

3. Member-elected Chair of the primary professional association, The Entrepreneurship Division (ENT) of the Academy Management (AoM), (2010/2011, as part of a 5-year service leadership cycle)

4. Greif Research Impact Award for most Impactful Entrepreneurship Article Published in 2003 (w. Benson Honig), 2009

5. The 2009 Journal of Business Venturing Award for most Impactful Article published in 2003 (w. Benson Honig)

6. Journal of Management Studies Best Paper Prize, 2006 (w. Shaker Zahra & Harry Sapienza) 

7. Inducted into 21st Century Entrepreneurship Research Fellows, a select group of 15 scholars established by the Global Consortium of Entrepreneurship Centres to advance entrepreneurship research worldwide, 2017

8. Selected to contribute a chapter to the volume The Makers of Modern Entrepreneurship, (Routledge), featuring academic thought leaders in the field, 2017

9. 11 Best Paper Awards from leading international conferences

10. Invited keynote speaker at 29 international conferences

Selected articles 

Data below is received from Scopus

Most cited 

1. The role of social and human capital among nascent entrepreneurs, 2003

2. Entrepreneurship and dynamic capabilities: A review, model and research agenda, 2006

3. Arriving at the high-growth firm, 2003

4. Researching Entrepreneurship: Conceptualization and Design. New York: Springer.

5. Where do they come from? prevalence and characteristics of nascent entrepreneurs, 2000

Recently Published 

1. Davidsson, P. (2021). Ditching Discovery-Creation for Unified Venture Creation Research. Entrepreneurship Theory and Practice.

2. Davidsson, P., Grégoire, D., & Lex, M. (2021). Venture idea assessment (VIA): Development of a needed concept, measure, and research agenda. Journal of Business Venturing, 36(5).

3. Kimjeon, J. & Davidsson, P. (2021). External enablers of entrepreneurship: A review and agenda for accumulation of strategically actionable knowledge. Entrepreneurship Theory and Practice.

4. Davidsson, P. & J. Grünhagen, J.H. (2021). Fulfilling the process promise: A review and agenda for new venture creation process research. Entrepreneurship Theory and Practice, 45(5) 1083–1118.

5. Davidsson, P., Recker, J. & von Briel, F. (2020). External enablement of new venture creation: A framework. Academy of Management Perspectives, 34(3), 311–332.

6. von Briel, F., Davidsson, P., & Recker, J. (2018). Digital technologies as external enablers of new venture creation in the IT hardware sector. Entrepreneurship Theory and Practice, 42(1), 47–69.

References

External links 

 

1958 births
Living people
Swedish emigrants to Australia
Academic staff of Queensland University of Technology
Stockholm School of Economics alumni
Academic staff of Umeå University
People from Sandviken Municipality
Australian business theorists
Swedish business theorists